Linda Harvey Wild (born February 11, 1971) is a retired tennis player from the United States. Born as Linda Harvey, she later used the family name of her stepfather and coach Steve Wild.

Wild turned professional in 1989. In the first round of her first tournament in February 1990 in her hometown of Chicago, she defeated then fifth-ranked Arantxa Sánchez Vicario. During her career on the WTA Tour, she won five singles and five doubles titles. Her best Grand Slam singles performance came at the 1996 US Open, where she defeated Park Sung-hee, Kristie Boogert, Barbara Rittner and Lindsay Davenport to reach the quarterfinals, where she was defeated by Conchita Martinez. Her best doubles result she realized at the 1996 Australian Open, reaching the semifinals with Elizabeth Smylie.

Wild was a member of the United States Fed Cup team that won 1996 the title. She reached career-high rankings of No. 23 in singles (in September 1996) and No. 17 in doubles (July 1996). She retired from the tour in 2000.

WTA career finals

Singles: 9 (5 titles, 4 runner-ups)

Doubles: 11 (5 titles, 6 runner-ups)

References

External links
 
 
 

1971 births
Living people
American female tennis players
People from Arlington Heights, Illinois
Tennis people from Illinois
21st-century American women